Yosvany Hernandez Carbonell (born ) is a Cuban male volleyball player. He was part of the Cuba men's national volleyball team at the 2010 FIVB World League. On club level he plays for Volley Milano in Italian Volleyball League.

References

External links
profile at FIVB.org

1991 births
Living people
Cuban men's volleyball players
Place of birth missing (living people)
21st-century Cuban people
Expatriate volleyball players in Egypt
Expatriate volleyball players in Italy
Expatriate volleyball players in Indonesia
Expatriate volleyball players in Turkey
Expatriate volleyball players in South Korea
Expatriate volleyball players in China
Cuban expatriate sportspeople in Belarus
Cuban expatriate sportspeople in Saudi Arabia
Cuban expatriate sportspeople in Italy
Cuban expatriate sportspeople in Egypt
Cuban expatriate sportspeople in China
Cuban expatriate sportspeople in South Korea
Cuban expatriate sportspeople in Turkey